Louis Rudolph Harlan (July 13, 1922 – January 22, 2010) was an American academic historian who wrote a two-volume biography of the African-American educator and social leader Booker T. Washington and edited several volumes of Washington materials. He won the Bancroft Prize in 1973 and 1984, once for each volume, and the 1984 Pulitzer Prize for Biography or Autobiography for the second volume.

Early years
Harlan was born in Clay County, Mississippi, near the small city West Point. When he was three, his father was financially unable to retain their farm and moved the family to another small city, Decatur, Georgia.  At the start of World War II, while he was a history student at nearby Emory University, Harlan enlisted in the Navy and, upon receiving his degree (B.A., 1943), entered midshipman's school in 1943.  Serving as an officer on an infantry landing craft, he participated in the D-Day Normandy Landings as well as subsequent invasions in southern France.  In the wake of V-E Day, he was assigned to Enewetak Atoll in the Marshall Islands, in anticipation of the planned invasion of Japan.  Over fifty years later, in his 1996 wartime memoir, All at Sea: Coming of Age in World War II, published by University of Illinois Press, he recalled the long-ago conflict and drew historical lessons and parallels for future generations.  Discharged in 1945, with the rank of lieutenant, he returned to the study of history, earning an M.A. at Vanderbilt (1948) and a Ph.D. at Johns Hopkins (1955) where, upon hearing a presentation by African-American historian John Hope Franklin, he determined to make race relations in the South his main field of endeavor. At Johns Hopkins, Harlan was a student of C. Vann Woodward.

Career as historian of Booker T. Washington
In 1958, as a white Southerner during the early years of the Civil Rights Movement, Louis Harlan published his first book, Separate and Unequal: Public School Campaigns and Racism in the Southern Seaport States, 1901–1915.  Following stints as an associate professor at East Texas State Teachers College and University of Cincinnati, he became, in 1965, professor of history at the University of Maryland, within easy access to the collection of documents left by Booker T. Washington.  Over the next two decades, he continued to work on Washington's biography, while also editing, with another Washington historian, Raymond W. Smock, an edition of Washington's papers, which were published over a fourteen-year period, between 1972 and 1988, ultimately reaching fourteen volumes.

The two volumes of the biography, published eleven years apart, received praise from scholars and historians who referred to Harlan's ability in elucidating Washington's personality which, in Harlan's words, "had vanished into the roles it had played".

During his career Louis R. Harlan also served as president of the American Historical Association, the Organization of American Historians, and the Southern Historical Association.  He retired in 1992 and spent the immediate years completing his war memoir.  Diagnosed with Crohn's Disease, he died in Lexington, Virginia at the age of 87, and was survived by his wife, Sadie, two sons, Louis and Benjamin, and a grandchild.

Awards
 1984, Pulitzer Prize for Biography or Autobiography for Booker T. Washington, volume 2
 1973 and 1984, Bancroft Prize, for Booker T. Washington, volumes 1 and 2
 Beveridge Award for his books about Booker T. Washington

Works

Essays

Harlan, Louis R. "Sympathy and Detachment: Dilemmas of a Biographer." Conspectus of History 1.1 (1974): 29–36

Memoir

References

External links
 

20th-century American historians
American male non-fiction writers
Bancroft Prize winners
Pulitzer Prize for Biography or Autobiography winners
Writers from Georgia (U.S. state)
Historians from Mississippi
University of Maryland, College Park faculty
Emory University alumni
Vanderbilt University alumni
Johns Hopkins University alumni
People from Clay County, Mississippi
People from Decatur, Georgia
Deaths from liver cancer
Deaths from cancer in Maryland
1922 births
2010 deaths
20th-century American male writers